Tepecik is a village in the Tut District, Adıyaman Province, Turkey. The village is populated by Kurds and had a population of 270 in 2021.

History 
The village was populated by Kurds of the Kawan tribe in 1560.

References

Villages in Tut District
Kurdish settlements in Adıyaman Province